is a Japanese manga artist best known for her cat manga Chi's Sweet Home. 
Her first manga  was published in the magazine Nakayoshi in 1982. Both Chi's Sweet Home and  have been published in English by Vertical Inc.

Manga artist Risa Itō and Kanata are from the same small town and Kanata's father was Itō's homeroom teacher in elementary school.

References

External links
 

1958 births
Living people
Manga artists from Nagano Prefecture